Hindu Sanskar Radio is a Hindu teachings based radio station broadcast from Leicester. It is run by volunteers and the local Hindu temples. It transmits on DAB Digital Radio and from its website. During Hindu religious festivals, it also transmits on analogue radio.

Reference

External links
Official website

Religious radio stations in the United Kingdom
Hindu mass media
British Indian mass media
Hinduism in the United Kingdom
Hindu radio stations
Hindu radio stations in the United Kingdom